Central Napier is the central area and business district of Napier, in the Hawke's Bay region of New Zealand's eastern North Island. It enjoys two schools in the main area - Nelson Park School and Napier Intermediate. The main shopping street/downtown area of Napier is Emerson Street. Central Napier enjoys Art Deco style architecture on surrounding buildings in Emerson Street. Housing in Central Napier is quite calm, with housing options available in various places throughout Central Napier. Most houses were built between 1900-2010.

Economy

Retail

Mid City Plaza opened between 1920 and 1933. It covers 3,177 m², and had 9 tenants and 20 carparks in May 2019.

Ocean Boulevard Mall opened in 1976. It contained just two tenants and no publicly available carparks in March 2020.

Demographics

Napier Central had a population of 420 at the 2018 New Zealand census, an increase of 6 people (1.4%) since the 2013 census, and an increase of 15 people (3.7%) since the 2006 census. There were 126 households, comprising 237 males and 186 females, giving a sex ratio of 1.27 males per female. The median age was 31.9 years (compared with 37.4 years nationally), with 45 people (10.7%) aged under 15 years, 144 (34.3%) aged 15 to 29, 192 (45.7%) aged 30 to 64, and 36 (8.6%) aged 65 or older.

Ethnicities were 69.3% European/Pākehā, 23.6% Māori, 4.3% Pacific peoples, 11.4% Asian, and 4.3% other ethnicities. People may identify with more than one ethnicity.

The percentage of people born overseas was 35.0, compared with 27.1% nationally.

Although some people chose not to answer the census's question about religious affiliation, 52.1% had no religion, 30.7% were Christian, 2.1% had Māori religious beliefs, 0.7% were Muslim, 3.6% were Buddhist and 4.3% had other religions.

Of those at least 15 years old, 57 (15.2%) people had a bachelor's or higher degree, and 42 (11.2%) people had no formal qualifications. The median income was $22,700, compared with $31,800 nationally. 39 people (10.4%) earned over $70,000 compared to 17.2% nationally. The employment status of those at least 15 was that 216 (57.6%) people were employed full-time, 60 (16.0%) were part-time, and 15 (4.0%) were unemployed.

References

Suburbs of Napier, New Zealand
Napier
Populated places around Hawke Bay